Kartz is a surname. Notable people with the surname include:

Franz Kartz (1907–?), German boxer 
Harry Kartz (1913–2016), British businessman 
Keith Kartz (born 1963), American football player

See also
Madagascar Kartz, a racing game